The 1933 Cuba–Bahamas hurricane was last of six major hurricanes, or at least a Category 3 on the Saffir-Simpson hurricane wind scale, in the active 1933 Atlantic hurricane season. It formed on October 1 in the Caribbean Sea as the seventeenth tropical storm, and initially moved slowly to the north. While passing west of Jamaica, the storm damaged banana plantations and killed one person. On October 3, the storm became a hurricane, and the next day crossed western Cuba. Advance warning in the country prevented any storm-related fatalities, although four people suspected of looting were shot and killed during a curfew in Havana. The German travel writer Richard Katz witnessed the hurricane while in Havana, and described the experience in his book "Loafing Around the Globe" ("Ein Bummel um Die Welt").

After entering the Florida Straits, the hurricane turned to the northeast, producing tropical storm winds along the Florida Keys. High rainfall caused flooding, while three tornadoes spawned by the storm damaged houses in the Miami area. It subsequently weakened and became extratropical on October 8. The former hurricane lashed the coast of Nova Scotia with high winds and rain, leaving about $1 million (1933 CAD) in damage. Rough seas sank several ships and killed nine people in the region. The remnants of the hurricane eventually dissipated on October 9 to the south of Newfoundland.

Meteorological history

Toward the end of September 1933, there was a large area of disturbed weather across the southern Caribbean Sea. By September 30, a low pressure area developed south of San Andrés island. The next day, observations from a station at Cabo Gracias a Dios and a ship indicated a tropical storm had developed off the eastern coast of Honduras. Low atmospheric pressure suggested the system had winds of tropical storm force despite lack of direct observations. Moving northward, the storm gained size as it slowly intensified. Based on observations and interpolation of data, it is estimated the storm became a hurricane early on October 3 while passing west of Jamaica. That day, a station at South Negril Point that day reported a force 8 on the Beaufort scale, well to the east of the center. At 0900 UTC on October 4, the hurricane made landfall on the Zapata Peninsula of Cuba, followed by a second landfall on the Cuban mainland three hours later.

The hurricane weakened slightly over land before emerging into the Straits of Florida and re-intensifying. On October 5, it turned to the northeast while remaining southeast of the Florida mainland, although the strongest winds remained over water. The storm maintained peak winds for about 18 hours, after which it weakened while accelerating to the northeast. After passing to the west of Bermuda on October 7, the hurricane became extratropical the next day while still maintaining hurricane-force winds. The storm brushed the coast of Nova Scotia before it was last noted approaching another extratropical storm on October 9 to the south of Atlantic Canada.

Preparations and impact
Early in its duration, the developing storm brushed the coast of Honduras with light winds. In Jamaica, gusts approached hurricane force, while heavy rainfall damaged transportation in Kingston. The storm wrecked small houses and damaged the local banana industry. There was one death in Jamaica. This prompted officials to declare a curfew for the capital in the midst of political upheaval following a coup. A newspaper described the curfew before the storm as "the most peaceful night in a week." However, the government ordered soldiers in Havana to shoot anyone suspected of looting, and four looters were killed during the storm's passage. Heavy associated rainfall caused rivers to overflow in three provinces, flooding low-lying areas. In Cienfuegos, the storm destroyed several houses. Offshore northern Cuba, two United States ships took shelter at the port in Matanzas due to rough seas. Due to advance warning and evacuations, there were no direct deaths in the country, and 20 people were injured.

Storm warnings were issued on the west coast of Florida to Boca Grande and on the east coast to Titusville, with hurricane warnings for the Florida Keys. There, the storm knocked over several trees and caused some power outages. Portions of the city were flooded while boats were washed ashore. Elsewhere in Florida, three tornadoes were reported during the hurricane's passage. In Fort Lauderdale, a tornado injured one person, and another one in Miami knocked down four homes and injured two. The third tornado was in Hollywood, where several houses were damaged.

There, the storm also dropped heavy rainfall reaching  over two days, including  in 24 hours. Flooding covered streets in the province, causing traffic jams, and farmlands. In Annapolis Valley, the rainfall washed out a bridge while the winds damaged about one-third of the apple crop. The dam at Chocolate Lake overflowed due to the rainfall, and a dam broke in Great Village, destroying a nearby bridge. Many trees fell during the storm, resulting in power outages after some fell onto lines. In Newfoundland, the storm washed out three bridges, as well as portions of roads and rails, and flooded one house. Throughout Atlantic Canada, high waves washed ashore, sank, or broke at least ten boats from their moorings, killing nine people including seven from an overturned boat sailing from Boston to Yarmouth. Overall damage in Canada was estimated at $1 million (1933 CAD), including $250,000 in lost apple crop.

See also

 List of Florida hurricanes (1900–49)

Notes

References

1933 Atlantic hurricane season
1933 Cuba Bahamas
1933 Cuba Bahamas
1933 Cuba Bahamas
1933 Cuba Bahamas
1933 in Cuba
1933 in the Bahamas
1933 natural disasters in the United States
1933 in Florida